William Marshall, William Marshal, or Bill Marshall may refer to:

Politicians, noblemen and military leaders
William Marshal, 1st Earl of Pembroke (1147–1219), Anglo Norman nobleman and crusader
William Marshal, 2nd Earl of Pembroke (1190–1231), English nobleman, son of the above
William Marshal, 1st Baron Marshal, slain at the Battle of Bannockburn 24 June 1314
William Marshall (1796–1872), British politician
William Marshall (Australian politician) (1885–1952), Western Australia MLA
William Marshall (British Army officer, born 1865), (1865–1939), British general
William Marshall (British Army officer, born 1889),  (1889–1918), British captain
William Louis Marshall (1846–1920), scion of the family of Chief Justice John Marshall
William Rainey Marshall (1825–1896), American politician; Republican governor of Minnesota, 1866–1870
William Thomas Marshall (1854–1920), English recipient of the Victoria Cross
William Marshall (Canadian politician) (born 1935), lawyer, judge and politician in Newfoundland
Bill Marshall (lawyer), Solicitor General of Ohio
Billy Marshall (1672–1792), King of the Gypsies

Arts and entertainment
William Marshall (actor) (1924–2003), African American actor in Blacula
William Marshall (bandleader) (1917–1994), American singer and bandleader
William Marshall (cinematographer) (1885–1943), American film technician
William Marshall (illustrator) (fl. 1617–1649), English engraver and illustrator
William Marshall (potter) (1923–2007), English studio potter
William Marshall (Scottish composer) (1748–1833), Scottish composer
William Calder Marshall (1813–1894), Scottish sculptor
William Leonard Marshall (1944–2003), Australian author of mystery novels
Bill Marshall (producer) (1939–2017), Scottish-born Canadian filmmaker, film and theater producer
William Forbes Marshall (1888–1959), Ulster poet and Presbyterian minister

Sports
William Marshall (tennis) (1849–1921), English tennis player
William Marshall (rugby), Scottish rugby player
William C. Marshall (1918–2005), Barbadian champion racehorse trainer
William Marshall (Australian footballer) (1884–1971), Australian rules footballer in the VFL
Doc Marshall (catcher) (William Riddle Marshall, 1875–1959), American baseball player
Bill Marshall (American football), founder and long-time head coach of the Detroit Heralds of the early National Football League
Bill Marshall (baseball) (1911–1977), American Major League Baseball player
Billy Marshall (1936–2007), Northern Irish footballer
Harry Marshall (born William Harry Marshall, 1905–1959), English footballer
Bill Marshall (Australian footballer) (1892–1945), Australian footballer
Willie Marshall (ice hockey)
Willie Marshall (Scottish footballer)

Others
William Marshall (agricultural writer) (1745–1818), English writer and critic on agricultural and horticultural topics
William Marshall (translator) (died 1540), client of Thomas Cromwell, translator of Marsiglio of Padua's Defensor Pacis
William Marshall (teacher) (1817–1906), New Zealand teacher and clergyman
William Crosby Marshall (1870-1934), mechanical engineer, Professor of Machine Design and Descriptive Geometry and author.

See also
Marshall (name)